Dalton Moreira Neto, usually known as Dalton (born February 5, 1990 in Rio de Janeiro), is a Brazilian football defender who currently plays for Bangu.

Professional
On 14 March 2011, Dalton signed a one-year loan deal with Paranaense.

He later moved to Club Universitario de Deportes in Peruvian Primera Division.

In February 2016, Dalton signed with Fort Lauderdale Strikers of the North American Soccer League.

Honours 
Luverdense
 Copa Verde: 2017

References

1990 births
Living people
Footballers from Rio de Janeiro (city)
Brazilian footballers
Brazilian expatriate footballers
Brazil under-20 international footballers
Brazil youth international footballers
Campeonato Brasileiro Série A players
Campeonato Brasileiro Série B players
Expatriate footballers in Peru
Expatriate soccer players in the United States
North American Soccer League players
Fluminense FC players
Sport Club Internacional players
Club Athletico Paranaense players
Club Universitario de Deportes footballers
Criciúma Esporte Clube players
Fort Lauderdale Strikers players
Luverdense Esporte Clube players
Bangu Atlético Clube players
Association football defenders